Martin F. Duke  (1867–1898) was a pitcher in Major League Baseball for the 1891 Washington Statesmen.

Duke was born as Martin Duck in 1867.

References

External links

Major League Baseball pitchers
Washington Statesmen players
Baseball players from Ohio
1867 births
1898 deaths
Zanesville Kickapoos players
Toledo Maumees (minor league) players
Minneapolis Millers (baseball) players
Binghamton Bingos players
Rochester Flour Cities players
New Orleans Pelicans (baseball) players
Birmingham Grays players
Birmingham Blues players
Savannah Modocs players
Richmond Crows players
19th-century baseball players